Costabile is a surname. Notable people with the surname include:

David Costabile (born 1967), American actor
Raymond Costabile (born 1958), American urologist
Sérgio Costabile (born 2000), Brazilian footballer